The Europa Orbiter  was a planned NASA mission to Jupiter's Moon Europa, that was cancelled in 2002. Its main objectives included determining the presence or absence of a subsurface ocean and identifying candidate sites for future lander missions. Europa Orbiter received pre-project funding in 1998, and resulted from NASA's Fire and Ice project.

History 
It would have been powered by Radioisotope thermoelectric generator (RTG) power and 2003 launch from the Space Shuttle. This would have meant an arrival at Jupiter in 2007, at which time it would commence in three-part science tour focused on Europa. The spacecraft would be radiation hardened to survive a predicted 4 megarads of radiation.

The science payload would include a radar to determine the thickness of ice at Europa, and determine what was below it. Other instruments would be an altimeter and imaging systems, among other devices.

In 1999, NASA issued an announcement of opportunity that solicited experiments for Europa Orbiter, Pluto Kuiper Express, and Parker Solar Probe.

The results of the studies on the Europa Orbiter have been conducive to the Jupiter Europa Orbiter (JEO), NASA's contribution to the planned international Europa Jupiter System Mission (EJSM) that was slated for launch in 2020. EJSM was cancelled in 2011.

The Europa Orbiter-concept should not be confused with the Jovian Europa Orbiter, a feasibility study conducted by the European Space Agency (ESA) which was finally superseded by the EJSM, too.

Another Europa mission in this era was the Europa Ice Clipper, a Stardust mission-like sample return mission.

The next NASA mission to Jupiter was Juno, which was selected in 2005 as the next New Frontiers mission after New Horizons. It was launched in 2011 and arrived at Jupiter in the summer of 2016.

A 2002 paper noted the following challenges for this mission: "substantial energy required for a direct trajectory, the long duration of the mission, the high total-radiation dose, and the need for radioisotope thermoelectric generators". One mission plan involved first entering Jovian orbit, then use multiple gravity assists from the Moons of Jupiter to help it to enter the orbit of Europa with less rocket fuel.

Legacy 
Later in the 21st century, it was suggested the goal of the Europa Orbiter should have been to find places where the freshest sub-surface material had been brought the surface. This location would then be the target of a lander which could study what would hopefully be subsurface material, without having to drill down through the ice layer.

Another aspect that has been noted was that this concept was studied about three years leading up to its cancellation in 2002. After Europa Orbiter, NASA turned its attention to a nuclear fission powered orbiter for Europa for Project Prometheus.

Comparison 
Comparison of notional NASA missions targeting Jupiter's moon Europa.

See also

References 

Cancelled NASA space probes
Europa (moon)
Missions to Jupiter
Orbiters (space probe)
Cancelled Space Shuttle missions